Pasetti is an Italian surname. Notable people with the surname include:

Anna Pasetti, Italian pastellist active between 1800 and 1806
Luigi Pasetti (born 1945), Italian footballer
Nicolo Pasetti (born Nicolò Bernardino Pasetti Bombardella), American-Italian actor
Peter Pasetti (1916–1996), German actor

See also
Fabienne Diato-Pasetti (born 1965), Monégasque sport shooter

Italian-language surnames